The South African Railways Class GG 2-6-2+2-6-2 of 1925 was an articulated steam locomotive.

In 1925, the South African Railways placed a single Class GG Garratt articulated steam locomotive with a 2-6-2+2-6-2 Double Prairie type wheel arrangement in fast mainline passenger service.

Manufacturers
The Class GG 2-6-2+2-6-2 Double Prairie type Garratt locomotive was a development of the Class GB. It was designed for the South African Railways (SAR) with large coupled wheels for fast passenger service on mainline duties. A single locomotive, no. 2290, was delivered from Beyer, Peacock and Company in 1925. It was superheated, with a plate frame, a Belpaire firebox and Walschaerts valve gear. The Class GG was the only Garratt locomotive on the SAR that was intended primarily for passenger working.

Characteristics
At  diameter, the Class GG had the largest coupled wheels yet seen on a Garratt locomotive in South Africa. An innovation was a coal pusher at the back of the coal bunker, designed to ease the work of the fireman by pushing the coal forward to the front of the bunker when required. It was the only instance of this appliance being used on any SAR locomotive.

To keep costs down, the cylinders were not enlarged to compensate for the increased wheel diameter. As a result, the locomotive's tractive effort was inferior to that of the Class 15CA which was introduced on the same line between Touws River and De Aar a year later.

Service
It was initially placed in service at Touws River and employed to work the Union Limited and Union Express fast passenger trains south of De Aar, but because of its unsteadiness at speed it was taken off fast passenger traffic and demoted to ordinary passenger and goods train working out of Cape Town. No more Class GG locomotives were ordered and since it was a non-standard locomotive, it was staged by 1938 and scrapped in 1947.

Illustration

References

2440
2440
Beyer, Peacock locomotives
2-6-2+2-6-2 locomotives
Garratt locomotives
Cape gauge railway locomotives
Railway locomotives introduced in 1925
1925 in South Africa
Scrapped locomotives